Marylinka is a genus of moths belonging to the family Tortricidae.

Species
Marylinka mimera Razowski & Becker, 1983
Marylinka secunda Razowski & Becker, 2007

See also
List of Tortricidae genera

References

 , 2011: Diagnoses and remarks on genera of Tortricidae, 2: Cochylini (Lepidoptera: Tortricidae). Shilap Revista de Lepidopterologia 39 (156): 397–414.
 , 1983, Acta zool. cracov. 26: 438
 ,2005 World Catalogue of Insects, 6

External links
tortricidae.com

Cochylini
Tortricidae genera